Mga Awitin ng Puso is a studio album by Filipino singer-actress Nora Aunor, released in 1972 by Alpha Records Corporation in the Philippines in LP format. Songs from this album are also included on a compilation album from 1990 called Mga Awiting Sariling Atin. This is Aunor's third album with all-Filipino compositions featuring kundiman classics Ikaw, Buhat, Dahil Sa Yo, Minamahal Kita and Pangako ng Puso.

Track listing

Side One

Side Two

Album credits 
Musical arranger

 Doming Valdez

Recording supervisor

 Gil Cruz

Recorded at
 CAI Studios

Original cover design
 Rudy Retanan

See also
 Nora Aunor discography

References 

Nora Aunor albums
1972 albums